Jang Liu (born October 6, 1978) is a South Korean actress. In 2009 she began to establish herself in independent films, quickly earning accolades for her performance as a troubled prostitute in Kim Gok’s Exhausted, which she starred in with Park Ji-hwan; the two also appeared together in Anti Gas Skin, with Jang playing a lead role of "wolf girl" Mi-joo. Jang has continued to perform in film and television productions, more recently appearing in the horror thriller The Mimic and starring as family matriarch Hye-young in the multi-award winning film Move the Grave.

Filmography

Film

Television series

References

External links 
 “Jang Liu” at HanCinema
 

1978 births
Living people
21st-century South Korean actresses
South Korean television actresses
South Korean actresses